N'Djamena International Airport   serves N'Djamena, the capital city of Chad.  It is the country's only international airport.  The airport is dual use, with civilian and military installations on opposite sides of the single runway.

Facilities

French military base
There has been a French military base here since independence, the only lapses being in 1975 and again for a couple of years beginning in 1978. After Operation Epervier started, it has been extensively used by French Air Force and Army during various operations.  In 2016, Epervier is composed of about 1500 men, a dozen Mirage 2000 fighters, Puma and Caiman helicopters, and transport and tankers aircraft (C-160 Transall, Boeing KC-135, C-130 Hercules) Operations are undertaken over neighbouring Mali and Niger for Operation Barkhane, combating militant groups throughout the southern Sahara. The entire area is under the authority of COMELEF, typically a French Air Force colonel. The importance of the operation does mean that the runway is always open, and that excellent primary radar coverage is provided, as well as other facilities (military hospital, rescue and fire services, assistance with ATC)

On September 7, 1987 a Tupolev Tu-22 of the Libyan Arab Air Force was shot down as it was bombing the French base. French Army Hawk missiles downed this aircraft, three crew members being killed - and the bombs missed their targets, falling in sandy areas.

The French base is also shared by the Chadian Air Force with Su-25 Frogfoot, Mi-24 Hind helicopters, and C-130 Hercules stationed there.

Airlines and destinations

Passenger

Cargo

Statistics

Incidents
 On 28 January 1978, Douglas C-47 TT-EAB of Air Tchad was reportedly shot down by rebels near Tibesti. The damaged aircraft apparently landed at N'Djamena International Airport.

 On 19 September 1989, UTA Flight 772, a McDonnell Douglas DC-10-30 (registration N54629) operating the Brazzaville-N'Djamena-Paris CDG sector, was bombed 46 minutes after take-off from N'Djamena causing the aircraft to crash while flying over Niger. All 156 passengers and 14 crew members on board perished.

 On 24 July 2001, Vickers Viscount 3D-OHM of Transtel was damaged beyond economic repair in a take-off accident. Although written off by the insurers, the aircraft was repaired. Repairs were almost complete when a soldier accidentally discharged his gun, puncturing a fuel tank.

 On 24 January 2007, Air West Flight 612, a Boeing 737-200, landed at N'Djamena after being hijacked.

See also 
 Transport in Chad

References

External links 
 
 

Airports in Chad
N'Djamena
Military installations of France in other countries